Vladimir Putin, current president of Russia, has owned seven dogs since he became president; since 2014, he has owned four dogs. His fondness of dogs has led to dogs becoming a notable political gift in Russian diplomatic relations.

List of dogs
When Putin took office, the Putin family had two poodles, Tosya and Rodeo. They reportedly stayed with his ex-wife Lyudmila after their divorce.

Konni (1999–2014)

Konni (1999–2014) was a female black Labrador Retriever. Konni was born in 1999 and presented to Putin in December 2000. Konni was often seen at Putin's side, and was sometimes allowed to attend meetings when he greeted world leaders during visits to Russia.

During a meeting with Angela Merkel, German Chancellor at the time, in 2007 in Putin's home in Sochi, Konni attended the meeting. Merkel, who was bitten by a dog in 1995, was seen freezing up as Konni sniffed her. Merkel later stated of the incident that: "He's afraid of his own weakness. Russia has nothing, no successful politics or economy. All they have is this." Putin himself said in 2016 to the German newspaper Bild, that he had no intention of scaring Merkel and that he had apologized to her.

Putin was being updated on the progress of the Russian Global Navigation Satellite System (GLONASS) in 2007 when he inquired whether he would be able to buy a device hooked into GLONASS that would allow him to keep track of his dog, Konni. The collar was demonstrated on Konni on 17 October 2008, thus making Konni the first recipient of a GLONASS-enabled pet collar.

Buffy (2010–present)
Buffy, a caramel and white Bulgarian male 10-week-old shepherd Karakachan dog, was given to President Vladimir Putin during a visit to Bulgaria in November 2010 by Bulgarian Prime Minister Boyko Borisov. The name 'Buffy' was chosen by a five-year-old boy during a nationwide competition.

Yume (2012–present)
Yume, a 3-month-old female Akita puppy, arrived in Moscow from Tokyo, Japan, in July 2012, as the Akita Prefecture's gift to show gratitude for assistance from Russia after the 2011 Tōhoku earthquake and tsunami. 'Yume' means 'dream' in Japanese.

In 2016, the Japanese government offered Putin a male Akita puppy as a companion for Yume, but this gift was declined.

Verni (2017–present) 
Verni was a birthday gift from Gurbanguly Berdimuhamedow, President of Turkmenistan, during a meeting in Sochi in October 2017. The puppy is an Alabai, a top Turkmen-bred variety of the Central Asia
shepherd dog. 'Verni' means 'faithful' or 'loyal' in Russian.

Pasha (2019–present) 
Pasha is a Šarplaninac puppy that was given to Putin from Serbian President Aleksandar Vučić during an official visit in January 2019.

Gallery

See also
 Canadian Parliamentary Cats
 Chief Mouser to the Cabinet Office, United Kingdom
 Hermitage cats in Saint Petersburg, Russia
 Tibs the Great
 Cats of the President of Taiwan
 United States Presidential Pets
 Pets of the British Royal Family
 Pets in the United Kingdom

References

 
Vladimir Putin